The AMT Automag V is a large single action semi-automatic pistol made by Arcadia Machine and Tool (AMT). The weapon was created by Harry Sanford, inventor of the original .44 AutoMag pistol.

Production quantity was to be 3000 units, numbered 0001-3000 to 3000-3000. This goal was never reached. The MK V used the same frame as the MK IV, and pistols have been discovered with MK V frames with MK IV slides and vice versa.

Design 
The AMT Automag V was designed to fire a .50 calibre cartridge, notably .50 Action Express. It had built-in compensator ports in the barrel to assist in keeping muzzle rise to tolerable levels. Furthermore, it was designed to hold a 5-round magazine and made primarily of cast stainless steel.

See also
 AutoMag (pistol)
 AMT AutoMag II
 AMT AutoMag III
 AMT AutoMag IV

References 

AMT semi-automatic pistols
.50 caliber handguns
Semi-auto magnum pistols